The 2010–11 Florida Gators men's basketball team represented the University of Florida in the sport of basketball during the 2010–11 college basketball season.  The Gators competed in Division I of the National Collegiate Athletic Association (NCAA) and the Eastern Division of the Southeastern Conference (SEC).  They were led by head coach Billy Donovan, and played their home games in the O'Connell Center on the university's Gainesville, Florida campus.

The Gators were the SEC regular season champions with a 13–3 conference record, but lost to Kentucky in the championship game of the 2011 SEC men's basketball tournament.  Small forward Chandler Parsons earned SEC Player of the Year honors, and head coach Billy Donovan won the SEC Coach of the Year award.  They received an at-large bid in the 2011 NCAA tournament as a No. 2 seed in southeast region where they advanced to the Elite Eight before losing to Butler in overtime.

Previous season
The Gators finished the season 21–13, 9–7 in SEC play and lost in the first round of the NCAA tournament to BYU.

Class of 2010

|-
| colspan="7" style="padding-left:10px;" | Overall Recruiting Rankings:     Scout – 14     Rivals – 19       ESPN – 9 
|}

Roster

Coaches

Team statistics 
As of March 16, 2011. 
 Indicates team leader in specific category.

Schedule and results
Retrieved from Gatorzone.com

|-
!colspan=8| Exhibition

|-
!colspan=8| Regular season (Non-conference play)
|-

|-
!colspan=8| Regular season (SEC conference play)
|-

|-
!colspan=8| SEC tournament
|-

|-
!colspan=8| NCAA tournament
|-

|-

NOTES
The game on Dec. 28 against Fairfield University was canceled due to a heavy snowstorm that prevented Fairfield (Connecticut) from traveling to Gainesville.

Rankings

Awards and honors 
 Chandler Parsons, SEC Player of the Year
 Billy Donovan, SEC Coach of the Year

References 

Florida Gators men's basketball seasons
Florida
Florida Gators men's basketball team
Florida Gators men's basketball team
Florida